Sambandet is a Norwegian rock group and the backing band of Åge Aleksandersen. Almost always referred to in that capacity they combined are known as Åge Aleksandersen & Sambandet, and together they won the 1980 Spellemannprisen for Ramp as best rock album. The group's membership has varied throughout the years. Some of the members has been Steinar Krokstad, Skjalg Raaen, Terje Tranaas and Gunnar Pedersen. They recorded their first album in 1977 titled Lirekassa.  Their most known hit is "Lys og varme" from 1984. The group had roots from Prudence. Sambandet broke up after the Eldorado touring in 1987 but reunited in 2004.

Members

Current
 Skjalg Raaen - guitarist (2004–)
 Steinar Krokstad - drummer (1993–)
 Gunnar Pedersen - guitarist (1982–)
 Terje Tranaas - keyboardist (2003–)
 Morty Black - bassist
 Bjørn Røstad - saxophonist (1980–)

Former
 Arne Jacobsen - guitarist (1976–1978)
 Gunnar Andreas Berg - guitarist (1978–1979)
 Tor Evensen - bassist (1978–1987)
 Lasse Hafreager - keyboardist (1980–1987)
 Per Christian Lindstad - guitarist (1978)
 Lars Kim Moe - bass (1977)
 Geir Myklebust - guitarist (1978)
 Alf Skille - keyboardist (1978)
 Christian Schreiner - bassist (1976)
 Knut Stensholm - drummer (1978–1987)
 Kaare Skevik - drummer (1982–1987)
 Bård Svendsen - keyboard (1978–1979)

Discography

Albums
1976: Mot i Brystet, Mord i Blikket, Bomben Und Granaten
1977: Lirekassa
1979: French only
1980: Ramp
1981: Mølje & Sodd
1982: Dains med mæ
1984: Levva Livet
1986: Eldorado
2005: To skritt frem
2005: 4 skritt tilbake
2008: Katalysator
2011: Furet værbitt

Singles
1977: "Positivitet"
1984: "Lys og varme"
2005: "Danserinnen"
2007: "Sommernatt"
2008: "Janne Ahonens smil"

Norwegian rock music groups
Spellemannprisen winners
Musical groups established in 1976
1976 establishments in Norway
Musical groups disestablished in 1987
1987 disestablishments in Norway
Musical groups reestablished in 2004
Musical groups from Trondheim

References